A radome (a portmanteau of radar and dome) is a structural, weatherproof enclosure that protects a radar antenna. The radome is constructed of material transparent to radio waves.  Radomes protect the antenna from weather and conceal antenna electronic equipment from view. They also protect nearby personnel from being accidentally struck by quickly rotating antennas.

Radomes can be constructed in several shapes spherical, geodesic, planar, etc. depending on the particular application, using various construction materials such as fiberglass, polytetrafluoroethylene (PTFE)-coated fabric, and others.

When found on fixed-wing aircraft with forward-looking radar, as are commonly used for object or weather detection, the nose cones often additionally serve as radomes. On aircraft used for airborne early warning and control (AEW&C), a rotating radome, often called a "rotodome", is mounted on the top of the fuselage for 360-degree coverage. Some newer AEW&C configurations instead use three antenna modules inside a radome, usually mounted on top of the fuselage, for 360-degree coverage, such as the Chinese KJ-2000 and Indian DRDO AEW&Cs. 

On rotary-wing and fixed-wing aircraft using microwave satellite for beyond-line-of-sight communication, radomes often appear as blisters on the fuselage. In addition to protection, radomes also streamline the antenna system, thus reducing drag.

The air supported radome built by Walter Bird in 1948 at the Cornell Aeronautical Laboratory is the first pneumatic construction built in history.

Use

A radome is often used to prevent ice and freezing rain from accumulating on antennas. In the case of a spinning radar parabolic antenna, the radome also protects the antenna from debris and rotational irregularities due to wind. Its shape is easily identified by its hardshell, which has strong properties against being damaged.

Stationary antennas
For stationary antennas, excessive amounts of ice can de-tune the antenna to the point where its impedance at the input frequency rises drastically, causing the voltage standing wave ratio (VSWR) to rise as well. This reflected power goes back to the transmitter, where it can cause overheating. A foldback circuit can act to prevent this; however, one drawback of its use is that it causes the station's output power to drop dramatically, reducing its range.  A radome avoids that by covering the antenna's exposed parts with a sturdy, weatherproof material, typically fiberglass, keeping debris or ice away from the antenna, thus preventing any serious issues. One of the main driving forces behind the development of fiberglass as a structural material was the need during World War II for radomes. When considering structural load, the use of a radome greatly reduces wind load in both normal and iced conditions. Many tower sites require or prefer the use of radomes for wind loading benefits and for protection from falling ice or debris.

Where radomes might be considered unsightly if near the ground, electric antenna heaters could be used instead. Usually running on direct current, the heaters do not interfere physically or electrically with the alternating current of the radio transmission.

Radar dishes
For radar dishes, a single, large, ball-shaped dome also protects the rotational mechanism and the sensitive electronics, and is heated in colder climates to prevent icing.

The RAF Menwith Hill electronic surveillance base, which includes over 30 radomes, is widely believed to regularly intercept satellite communications. At Menwith Hill, the radome enclosures prevent observers from seeing the direction of the antennas, and therefore which satellites are being targeted. Similarly, radomes prevent observation of antennas used in ECHELON facilities.

The United States Air Force Aerospace Defense Command operated and maintained dozens of air defense radar stations in the contiguous United States and Alaska during the Cold War. Most of the radars used at these ground stations were protected by rigid or inflatable radomes. The radomes were typically at least  in diameter and the radomes were attached to standardized radar tower buildings that housed the radar transmitter, receiver and antenna. Some of these radomes were very large. The CW-620 radome was designed and constructed by Sperry-Rand Corporation for the Columbus Division of North American Aviation. This radome was originally used for the FPS-35 search radar at Baker Air Force Station, Oregon. When Baker AFS was closed the radome was moved to provide a high-school gymnasium in Payette, Idaho. Pictures and documents are available online at radomes.org/museum for Baker AFS/821st Radar Squadron.

Maritime satellites
 For maritime satellite communications service, radomes are widely used to protect dish antennas which are continually tracking fixed satellites while the ship experiences pitch, roll and yaw movements. Large cruise ships and oil tankers may have radomes over 3m in diameter covering antennas for broadband transmissions for television, voice, data, and the Internet, while recent developments allow similar services from smaller installations such as the 85 cm motorised dish used in the SES Broadband for Maritime system. Small private yachts may use radomes as small as 26cm in diameter for voice and low-speed data.

Alternatives
An active electronically scanned array radar has no moving antenna and so a radome is not necessary. An example of this is the pyramid which replaced the golfball-style radome installations at RAF Fylingdales.

Notes

External links
Photograph of Mount Hebo while active overlooking Pacific Ocean

Radar
Domes
Antennas (radio)
British inventions